IF Tunabro is a Swedish football club located in Borlänge.

Background
IF Tunabro currently plays in Division 4 Dalarna which is the sixth tier of Swedish football. They play their home matches at the Gyllevallen in Borlänge.

The club is affiliated to Dalarnas Fotbollförbund. IF Tunabro have competed in the Svenska Cupen on 4 occasions and have played 4 matches in the competition.

Season to season

Footnotes

External links
 IF Tunabro – Official website

Football clubs in Dalarna County
Association football clubs established in 1960
1960 establishments in Sweden